Cold shoulder is an English expression.

Cold Shoulder may also refer to:

 "Cold Shoulder" (song), a 2008 song by Adele
 "Cold Shoulder", a 2022 song by Central Cee
 "Cold Shoulder", a song by Culture Club from the 1999 album Don't Mind If I Do
 "Cold Shoulder", a 1985 song by Evelyn Thomas
 "Cold Shoulder", a song by Garth Brooks from the 1991 album Ropin' the Wind
 "Cold Shoulder", a 2022 song by Gucci Mane featuring YoungBoy Never Broke Again from the 2018 album Evil Genius
 "Cold Shoulder", a song by Johnny Cash from the 1958 album The Fabulous Johnny Cash
 "Cold Shoulder", a song by Josh Turner from the 2012 album Punching Bag
 "Cold Shoulder", a song by N-Dubz from the 2010 album Love.Live.Life
 "Cold Shoulder", a song by Squeeze from the 1993 album Some Fantastic Place
 "Cold Shoulder", a song by Uncle Tupelo from the 1991 album Still Feel Gone
 Cold Shoulder, a backing band formed by previous members of the Aeroplanes